Dimity Reed (born 1942, Parkes, New South Wales, Australia) is an architect. She has been involved in government advisory roles, as well as writing for both The Sun and The Age newspapers.

Personal life

Dimity Reed was born in 1942 in Parkes, New South Wales, the middle child of two siblings. Her father worked at a local Coles during that time before being enlisted in the war and based out of New Guinea. When he returned from the war, the whole family moved to Victoria in 1946, taking up residence in South Melbourne, Victoria. She lived with her mother and older brother in a boarding house for itinerant works ran by her grandmother. During that time South Melbourne was undergoing a social change, where a lot of her neighbours and other tenants were being chased out of their homes as their landlords at the time were selling off the properties to developers. This was a key event in her life that provided to be catalysis for Dimity’s passion in the creation and development for low to no income housing.

She underwent her schooling at Melbourne Girls Grammar School in South Yarra and then went on to undertake the Bachelor of Architecture at Melbourne University straight after her graduation. She married towards the end of her second year of the degree and was pregnant with her first child by the start of the fifth, causing her to put her architectural career on hold. She then went back to study 10 years later, after giving birth to her three children, completing her Master of Architecture at RMIT University.

After graduating she went onto work for Kevin Borland for a few years, but Dimity was always interested in setting up her own private practice. When she expressed it to him, he was very supportive, and even gave her the current job that she was working on, a house extension in Mt Eliza. She worked as a solo practitioner for many years; her work was mainly with house and office alterations and renovations.

In 1982, shortly after successfully setting up her own practice, Dimity received a call from a government minister, asking her if she would like to work as a housing commissioner as the authority had gone into disrepute surrounding Land Deals. As part of her work with the housing commission Dimity looked at engaging the new young architects of the time such as Peter Corrigan and Greg Burgess to look at designing new houses for old torn down blocks within Carlton (many are still standing today). As well as addressing the state of high-rise commission housing in areas such as Broadmeadows in terms of its interaction with the communities that occupy them.

Reed has also been involved in various organizations and planning committees throughout her life, including starting Women in Architecture, an organisation set up to cultivate female talent within a primarily male-dominated field. She initially contacted every female who had graduated from an architecture degree in Victoria and set up meetings, of which bore some great female partnerships, like that of Anne Cunningham and Anne Keddie.

As the movement continued to grow, a select number of women decided to run for the board of the Royal Australian Institute of Architects, with four making in on and Dimity becoming the first female president of the RAIA (Victorian Chapter). She used her new role to get younger architects involved in the Institute (much like her housing commission work) and promoting their works and new philosophies on the city of Melbourne, introducing a new chapter of the RAIA and architecture within Melbourne.

Since then Dimity has worked on a series of commissions and panels, notably the Shrine of Remembrance Trustees for the new underground “Galleries of Remembrance” of which it was paramount in commissioning ARM for the project.

Dimity has always been involved in the active critiquing and discussion of architecture in the written media. She got her first writing job through Caroline Ross (a friend of Kevin Borland) who gave her a job at The Sun newspaper writing a weekly page on architecture in Melbourne, which also led to her writing for The Age newspaper and co-publishing a series of publications.

Notable Projects
Despite working as a practising architect with her own practice, Dimity has predominantly been involved in the urban planning realm, with her acting as an architectural advisor on a lot of planning and government boards. As well as providing architectural discussions in Melbourne’s local papers and collaborative publications, she also served as the head of design at RMIT and a professor of urban design.

In 2007 Dimity, with a small team started work on the revitalization of Dandenong City. The work was undertaken due to the city going through what Dimity describes as an “Urban Depression”. In 2006, the state government pledged $290 million to revitalize Dandenong in partnership with VicUrban and the Greater City of Dandenong. “Renovating a vast city follows the same process as renovating a house; it’s just that the implications are far-reaching, the costs are of a different order and the time lines stretch into the future”.

Though she is now retired from the architectural sphere, Dimity is still very active on the homeground board (a no-income housing initiative) and heads up her own film production company, Mad Women Films in conjunction with her two film maker sons.
 
They have recently released a series of films of Wagner's four Ring operas. "While there are a number of recordings and analyses of the Ring Cycle, I understand that no-one has yet explained on screen how Wagner used the music to tell his complex story, how each character and each event has a musical motif that recurs throughout the four operas.
All four episodes were produced in Melbourne by director Sam Reed and producer Professor Dimity Reed who worked with Professor Lees.   In the result their work makes a valuable contemporary contribution to the array of material dedicated to the Ring Cycle”.

List of projects

Publications
ABZ of Pregnancy, co-authored with Professor Carl Wood. Pub. Nelson. 1972 
Exploring Language: Senior English, co-authored with Judith Womersley. Pub. Harcourt Brace and Jovanovich 
Exploring Language: A Stretch of the Imagination, co-authored with Judith Womersley. Pub. Harcourt Brace and Jovanovich 
Australia’s Guide to Good Residential Design. National Office of Local Government 
Need, Greed and Indifference: Making the Australian Suburb. In preparation. 
Melbourne in Spires, a calendar on 150 years of Australian architecture 
Tangled Destinies: The National Museum of Australia. Pub: Images Publishing. 2002 
Judging Architecture: Image Publishing, 2003, Contributor 
Carlton, A History, 2003, Contributor. Pub: Melbourne University Press 
I Believe This, 2003, Contributor. Pub: Random House

Professional Experience
Head, Department of Design & Professor of Urban Design, RMIT (1992-2001) 
Member, Docklands Consultation Steering Committee 
Chair: Design Advisory Panel to the Melbourne Docklands Authority 
Member, Design, Amenity and Integration Panel, Docklands 
Design Advisor, VicUrban,

Criticism & Commentary
Urban Design commentator, The Age, (1988–present) 
Architecture writer, Herald Sun, 1982-1988 
Editor, Architect (1984–86) 
Editor, Building Today (1992–94) 
Editor, Antipodesign (1994-1996) 
Deakin Lecturer, Festival of Federation (2001) 
Local Government 
Councillor, City of St Kilda (1992-1994) 
Commissioner, City of Moreland (1994- 1996)

Professional Contributions
President, Royal Australian Institute of Architects (Victorian Chapter) (1984-1986) 
Awarded Life Fellowship of the R.A.I.A. (1992) 
Co-ordinator Melbourne Architecture Foundation (2001–present)
Part-time Member, Administrative Appeals Tribunal, Planning Division (1989 – 1994) 
Chair or Member of Panels hearing proposed Amendments to Planning Schemes 1984-2005 
General Manager, Housing Services, Ministry of Housing. (1982-1984) 
Chief Executive, White Paper Secretariat: The Victorian Government's White Paper on Housing (1981 – 1982) 
Commissioner, the Housing Commission of Victoria (1978-1982) 
Chairman of Directors, Archicentre Pt/Ltd (1980-1984) 
Co-ordinator of the pilot Victorian programme (1979) and the National programme (1980) of the Architecture in 
Schools programme (1979-1981) 
In charge of publications for the restoration of Werribee Park, for the Department of the Premier (1978) 
Founding member of the Association of Women in Architecture. (1978) 
Board Member, The Young Women's Christian Association (1978 – 2000) 
Architect with Kevin Borland and Associates (1972-1977) 
Melbourne Editor, Vogue Living (1970-1972)

Awards
Member Order of Australia 2006 for contribution to Urban Design, to affordable housing and to sustainable housing. 
The R.A.I.A Bates Smart and McCutcheon Award for Architectural Journalism: 1988 
The R.A.I.A. President’s Award for the Architects In Schools Programme: 1988 
The R.A.I.A President's Award for an outstanding contribution to architecture:1990 
The R.A.I.A. President's Award, Curation of the Home Sweet Home Exhibition, LaTrobe Library 1991 
The R.A.I.A Bates, Smart and McCutcheon Award for Architectural Journalism: 1996 
Honourable Mention in Southbank Housing Competition 1993. 
Royal Australian Institute of Architects Roll of Honour 2006

References

External links
 Dimity Reed - Contributor

Living people
University of Melbourne alumni
Architects from Melbourne
1942 births
Australian women architects
Australian architecture writers
21st-century Australian architects
20th-century Australian architects
20th-century Australian women